Big Bullet is a 1996 Hong Kong action film directed, produced and co-written by Benny Chan. The film won awards for film editing at the 1996 Golden Horse Film Festival and the 16th Hong Kong Film Awards.

Plot

After assaulting his tactical commander during a raid gone sour, a dedicated but temperamental cop Sergeant Bill Chu is transferred to the Emergency Unit, long considered to be the police force's dumping ground for problem cops. Together with his fellow EU patrol officers, Bill continues to fight crime and stops the Professor's attempt to smuggle confiscated money which he managed to retrieve from Interpol HQ out of Hong Kong via the British air base.

Release
Big Bullet was released in Hong Kong on 26 July 1996. It grossed a total of HK$9,771,575. At the 16th Hong Kong Film Awards, Big Bullet was nominated for seven awards: Best Film, Best Director (Benny Chan), Best Actor (Lau Ching-wan), Best Supporting Actor (Jordan Chan), Best Supporting Actress (Theresa Lee), Best Cinematography (Arthur Wong), Best Action Choreography (Ma Yuk-sing) and Best Original Music (Peter Kam). Peter Cheung and Cheung Ka-fai won the Best Editing award for their work on Big Bullet.

At the 1996 Golden Horse Film Festival, Big Bullet was nominated for Best Action Choreography (Ma Yuk-sing) and won the award for Best Film Editing (Peter Cheung and Cheung Ka-fai).

Cast
 Lau Ching-wan as Sergeant Bill Chu
 Jordan Chan as PC Jeff Chiu
 Theresa Lee as PC Apple
 Cheung Tat-ming as Matthew
 Francis Ng as Inspector Yeung (Bill's former boss)
 Anthony Wong as Bird
 Yu Rongguang as Professor
 Lam Sheung Yee as Senior Constable Dan (driver of EU van)
 Vincent Kok as Tung Fai
 Dayo Wong as Bill's informant
 Ruco Chan as Chiu Sai Wing (Jordan Chan's younger brother)

See also

 Hong Kong films of 1996
 List of action films of the 1990s

References

External links
 
 

1996 films
1990s action films
Hong Kong action films
Police detective films
1990s Cantonese-language films
Films directed by Benny Chan
Golden Harvest films
Films set in Hong Kong
Films shot in Hong Kong
Films with screenplays by Susan Chan
1990s Hong Kong films